Vangelis Kaounos (Greek: Βαγγέλης Καούνος; born 29 October 1977) is a Greek former professional footballer.

Career
Born in Arta, Kaounos previously played for Skoda Xanthi F.C. and Kallithea F.C. in the Alpha Ethniki. He also played for Ethnikos Asteras F.C., PAS Giannina, Kalamata F.C., Asteras Tripolis, Panetolikos F.C. and AEL 1964 FC .

References

External links
Guardian Football
In Sports
Profile at epae.org
Profile at Onsports.gr

1977 births
Living people
Greek footballers
Anagennisi Arta F.C. players
Kozani F.C. players
Xanthi F.C. players
Ethnikos Asteras F.C. players
Kallithea F.C. players
PAS Giannina F.C. players
Kalamata F.C. players
Asteras Tripolis F.C. players
Panetolikos F.C. players
Athlitiki Enosi Larissa F.C. players
Association football forwards
Footballers from Arta, Greece